Victoria Lizbeth Acevedo Ponce (born 16 January 1999), known as Victoria Acevedo, is a Mexican professional football midfielder who currently plays for Guadalajara (also known as Chivas) of the Liga MX Femenil, the first professional women's football league in Mexico. In 2017, she helped Chivas advance to the final where they won the first professional women's football championship in the country in front of 32,466 spectators.

Honours

Club
Guadalajara
Liga MX Femenil: Apertura 2017

References

External links
 
 Victoria Acevedo at C.D. Guadalajara Femenil 
 

1999 births
Living people
Mexican women's footballers
Footballers from Jalisco
Liga MX Femenil players
C.D. Guadalajara (women) footballers
Women's association football midfielders
20th-century Mexican women
21st-century Mexican women
Mexican footballers